Tanza National Comprehensive High School is a public high school located at Daang Amaya II, Tanza, Cavite, Philippines. The school is abbreviated as TNCHS or simply Tanza High. It was established in the year 1949.

Curriculum
Tanza National Comprehensive High School has 4 curriculums:
 General Curriculum (BEC-Basic education curriculum)
 Special Science Class (SSC)
 Special Program for Journalism (SPJ)
 Special Program in Foreign Language [Korean] (SPFL)

Strands 
Tanza National Comprehensive High School has 4 strands for Senior High School:

 Accountancy, Business and Management Strand (ABM)
 Humanities and Social Sciences (HUMSS)
 Science, Technology, Engineering and Mathematics (STEM)
 General Academic Strand (GAS)

Notable alumni
 Epimaco Velasco - former DILG Secretary and NBI Director

References

High schools in Cavite